George Curtis Smith (August 8, 1935 – April 15, 2020) was a senior United States district judge of the United States District Court for the Southern District of Ohio.

Education and career

Born in Columbus, Ohio, Smith received a Bachelor of Arts degree from Ohio State University in 1957 and a Juris Doctor from Ohio State University College of Law in 1959. He was an assistant city attorney of Columbus from 1959 to 1962, and then an executive assistant to Mayor Ralston Westlake of Columbus from 1962 to 1964. He was an assistant attorney general of Ohio in 1964. He was a chief counsel to the prosecuting attorney of Franklin County from 1965 to 1970, and was himself the prosecuting attorney of that county from 1971 to 1980. He was a judge on the Franklin County Municipal Court from 1980 to 1985, and on the Franklin County Common Pleas Court from 1985 to 1987.

Federal judicial service

On July 1, 1987, Smith was nominated by President Ronald Reagan to a seat on the United States District Court for the Southern District of Ohio vacated by Judge Joseph Peter Kinneary. Smith was confirmed by the United States Senate on November 6, 1987, and received his commission on November 9, 1987. He assumed senior status on January 1, 2002. He died on April 15, 2020, aged 84.

References

Sources
 

1935 births
2020 deaths
Lawyers from Columbus, Ohio
Ohio State University Moritz College of Law alumni
Ohio state court judges
Ohio State University alumni
Judges of the United States District Court for the Southern District of Ohio
United States district court judges appointed by Ronald Reagan
20th-century American judges
21st-century American judges